Imbonggu Rural LLG is a local-level government (LLG) of Southern Highlands Province, Papua New Guinea. The Kaugel language is spoken in the LLG.

Wards
01. Kisenapoi
02. Moka 1
03. Orei 1
04. Kumunge
05. Beechwood 1
06. Koropangi
07. Beechwood 2
08. Kume 1
09. Kume 2
10. Tona
11. Piambil 1
12. Piambil 2
13. Parare 1
14. Papare 1/Nagop 1
15. Papare 2/ Nagop 2
16. Orei 2
17. Moka 2
18. Kisenapoi 2/Puglupiri
19. Tukupangi
20. Nagop 3

References

Local-level governments of Southern Highlands Province